Hedvig is a given name. Notable people with the name include:

People
Hedvig Catharina De la Gardie (1732–1800), Swedish noblewoman of French descent
Hedvig Catharina Lilje (1695–1745), Swedish noblewoman, salonist and informal amateur-politician
Hedvig Charlotta Nordenflycht (1718–1763), Swedish poet, feminist and salon-hostess
Hedvig Eleonora Church, church in central Stockholm, Sweden
Hedvig Eleonora of Holstein-Gottorp (1636–1715), the queen consort of King Charles X of Sweden and queen mother of King Charles XI
Hedvig Eleonora von Fersen (1753–1792), Swedish noblewoman
Hedvig Elisabeth Charlotte of Holstein-Gottorp (1759–1818), the queen consort of Charles XIII of Sweden, famed diarist, memoirist and wit
Hedvig Hricak (born 1946), Croatian American radiologist
Hedvig Karakas (born 1990), Hungarian judoka
Hedvig Lindahl (born 1983), Swedish soccer goalkeeper
Hedvig Malina, ethnic Hungarian student from Slovakia, physically assaulted in a hate crime incident
Hedvig Raa-Winterhjelm (1838–1907), Swedish actor active in Sweden, Norway and Finland
Hedvig Sophia of Sweden (1681–1708), Duchess of Holstein-Gottorp, was the eldest child of King Charles XI of Sweden
Hedvig Taube (1714–1744), Swedish noblewoman, official mistress to King Frederick I of Sweden
Hedvig Wigert (1748–1780), Swedish opera singer

Fictional characters
Hedvig, a main character in Henrik Ibsen's play the Wild Duck

See also
Hedwig
Hedwig (name)

Feminine given names